Baconia is a genus of clown beetles in the family Histeridae. There are at least 110 described species in Baconia.

See also
 List of Baconia species

References

Further reading

 
 
 

Histeridae
Articles created by Qbugbot